The 1991 ICF Canoe Slalom World Championships were held in Tacen, Yugoslavia (now in Slovenia) under the auspices of International Canoe Federation at the Tacen Whitewater Course. It was the 22nd edition. This was one of the last events held in Yugoslavia prior to the Yugoslav wars and subsequent breakup. Slovenia would declare its independence on 25 June, just two days after the event ended. It also marked the first time Germany competed as a nation following the reunification of East Germany and West Germany the previous year.

Medal summary

Men's

Canoe

Kayak

Women's

Kayak

Medals table

References
Official results
International Canoe Federation

Icf Canoe Slalom World Championships, 1991
ICF Canoe Slalom World Championships
International sports competitions hosted by Yugoslavia
Icf Canoe Slalom World Championships, 1991
Canoeing and kayaking competitions in Yugoslavia